Schistopterum longulum is a species of tephritid or fruit flies in the genus Schistopterum of the family Tephritidae.

Distribution
Kenya.

References

Tephritinae
Insects described in 1937
Diptera of Africa